In algebraic geometry a normal crossing singularity is a singularity similar to a union of coordinate hyperplanes. The term can be confusing because normal crossing singularities are not usually normal schemes (in the sense of the local rings being integrally closed).

Normal crossing divisors
In algebraic geometry, normal crossing divisors are  a class of divisors which generalize the smooth divisors. Intuitively they cross only in a transversal way.

Let A be an algebraic variety, and  a reduced Cartier divisor, with  its irreducible components. Then Z is called a smooth normal crossing divisor if either

(i) A is a curve, or 
(ii) all  are smooth, and for each component ,  is a smooth normal crossing divisor.

Equivalently, one says that a reduced divisor has normal crossings if each point étale locally looks like the intersection of coordinate hyperplanes.

Normal crossing singularity
In algebraic geometry a normal crossings  singularity is a point in an algebraic variety that is locally isomorphic to a normal crossings divisor.

Simple normal crossing singularity
In algebraic geometry a simple normal crossings singularity is a point in an algebraic variety, the latter having smooth irreducible components, that is locally isomorphic to a normal crossings divisor.

Examples
 The normal crossing points in the algebraic variety called the Whitney umbrella are not simple normal crossings singularities.
The variety itself, seen as a subvariety of the two-dimensional affine plane is an example of a normal crossings divisor.
 Any variety which is the union of smooth varieties which all have smooth intersections is a variety with normal crossing singularities. For example, let  be irreducible polynomials defining smooth hypersurfaces such that the ideal  defines a smooth curve. Then  is a surface with normal crossing singularities.

References 

 Robert Lazarsfeld, Positivity in algebraic geometry, Springer-Verlag, Berlin, 1994.

Algebraic geometry
Geometry of divisors